Captain 1st rank is a rank used by the Russian Navy and a number of former communist states. The rank is the most senior rank in the staff officers' career group. The rank is equivalent to colonel in armies and air forces. Within NATO forces, the rank is rated as OF-5 and is equivalent to captain in English-speaking navies.

Russia

The rank was introduced in Russia by Peter the Great in 1713. By decision of the so-called military navy commission (ru: Воинская морскaя комиссия) in 1732 the sequence of Kapitan ranks was abolished. However, until 1752 the grade rank Kapitan 1st rank was corresponding to Fleet kapitan (ru: флота капитан). Finally, the Kapitan ranks were reintroduced September 5 (16), 1751. The Red Army introduced the Kapitan 1st rank rank in 1935, together with a number of other former Russian ranks, and it continues to be used in many ex-USSR countries, including Russia.

The first OF-5 equivalent rank in the Soviet Navy (from 1918 to 1935) was Ship komandir 1st rank, also Ship commander 1st rank, (ru: командир корабля 1-ого ранга; literal: Commander of the ship 1st rank).

This particular rank was introduced by disposal of the Central Executive Committee of the Soviet Union and the Council of People's Commissars, from September 22, 1935.

The equivalent rank designation in the Soviet Navy for warship engineers was  Kapitan 1st rank-engineer. Other non-seagoing naval personnel of OF-5 rank, such as in medical service, chemical defence, marines, and naval aviation, have the rank of Polkovnik.

In the navy of the Russian Federation there are three ranks in the staff officer (until 1917: stab-ofizer, derived from German Stabsoffizier) career group:
 Captain 1st rank
 Captain 2nd rank
 Captain 3rd rank

Types of rank insignia Kapitan 1st rank and naval equivalents

Captain 1st rank insignia

See also 
 Ranks and rank insignia of the Russian armed forces until 1917
 Ranks and rank insignia of the Red Army 1918–1935, ... 1935–1940 and ... 1940–1943
 Ranks and rank insignia of the Soviet Army 1943–1955 and Ranks and rank insignia of the Soviet Army 1955–1991,
 Ranks and rank insignia of the Russian Federation´s armed forces 1994–2010
 Naval ranks and insignia of the Russian Federation

References

Military ranks of Russia
Military ranks of the Soviet Union
Military ranks of Ukraine